Vanjipalaiyam railway station is a station in Tiruppur district of Tamil Nadu, India. All trains plying between Tiruppur railway station and Coimbatore Junction railway station passes through this.

References

Salem railway division
Railway stations in Tiruppur district